Simmons Lake is a lake in the U.S. state of Washington.

Simmons Lake was named after Michael T. Simmons, a pioneer citizen. A variant name was "Ken Lake".

See also
List of lakes in Washington

References

Lakes of Thurston County, Washington
Lakes of Washington (state)